{{Taxobox
| name = Aporometra paedophora
| image = Aporometra paedophora (F 88977) 01.jpg
| image_caption = Aporometra paedophora 
| image2 = Aporometra paedophora BHLp4 091879200110073.pdf
| image2_caption =Aporometra paedophora Figs 4-10, Plate XLVII (HL Clark, 1909)
| regnum = Animalia
| phylum = Echinodermata
| classis = Crinoidea
| subclassis = Articulata
| familia = Aporometridae
| genus = Aporometra
| species = A. paedophora
| binomial = Aporometra paedophora
| binomial_authority = (HL Clark, 1909)
| synonyms = *Himerometra paedophora <small>HL Clark, 1909</small>
| synonyms_ref = 
}}Aporometra paedophora is a marine invertebrate, a species of crinoid or feather star in the family Aporometridae. It was first found at a depth of 22 fathoms (40.2 m) off the Manning River on the New South Wales coast. Other specimens were found off the coast of Bunbury, Western Australia at depths between 9 and 15 m (but these have since been identified as Aporometra wilsoni). Based on morphological evidence of four (somewhat degraded) specimens of A. paedophora (all paratypes), Helgen & Rouse believe that this may not be a separate species from Aporometra wilsoni.

Description
Plate XLVII shows three types of pinnules: first, second and distal pinnules (Figs 4-6), and pentacrinoid larvae (Figs 7-9) from youngest to oldest. Fig 10 shows a cirrus.
In the earliest free-swimming stage, the arms are about 7 mm long and have about nine pinnules on each side.
All Clark's large specimens carried pentacrinoid larvae attached to their pinnules.

Distribution
This crinoid is endemic to temperate Australian waters, and apparently found only off the Manning River, in New South Wales.

Ecology
The first specimens of Aporometra paedophora to be described were  found clinging by their cirri  to the pinnules and cirri of the crinoid, Ptilometra macronema.

Crinoids are dioecious, with separate male and female individuals. They do not have true gonads, instead they produce gametes from genital canals found inside some of the pinnules. In most species, the sperm and eggs are released into the water column when the pinnules rupture. However,  as with Aporometra wilsoni, older specimens of A. paedophora'' carry their larvae in their pinnules.

References

External links

Aporometridae
Animals described in 1909
Taxa named by Hubert Lyman Clark